Športno društvo NK Kolpa, commonly referred to as NK Kolpa or simply Kolpa, is a Slovenian football team from the village of Podzemelj. The club was founded in 1990.

History
Kolpa have competed in the Slovenian Cup on two occasions, in 1998–99 and 2001–02, reaching the last 32 on each occasion. They have also played in the Slovenian Third League in 2004–05 and 2005–06 before relegating back to the lower tiers. Kolpa returned to the Slovenian Third League in the 2014–15 season.

Honours
Slovenian Fourth Division
Winners: 1994–95, 2003–04, 2019–20

References

External links
Official website 

Association football clubs established in 1990
Football clubs in Slovenia
1990 establishments in Slovenia